Ramona Bădescu (born 29 November 1968) is a Romanian-Italian actor, singer, model, and politician. In 2008 Bădescu joined the list of council candidates supporting Gianni Alemanno for Mayor of Rome, but was not successful. However Alemanno was elected mayor and subsequently appointed her his ''Counsellor for the Romanian Community of Italy.

Filmography

Films

Television

References

External links

1968 births
Living people
Italian actor-politicians
Italian female models
Italian women singers
Italian television presenters
Italian women television presenters
Romanian emigrants to Italy
Naturalised citizens of Italy
People from Craiova
Romanian actresses
20th-century Romanian women singers
20th-century Romanian singers